87th Street may refer to:

In Chicago
87th Street (Metra)
87th Street (Woodruff) (Metra)
87th (CTA station)

Elsewhere
87th Street (Manhattan), New York City